Alcantara, officially the Municipality of Alcantara,  is a 5th class municipality in the province of Cebu, Philippines. According to the 2020 census, it has a population of 16,910 people.

Alcantara is bordered to the north by the town of Ronda, to the west is the Tañon Strait, to the east is the town of Argao, and to the south is the town of Moalboal.

Geography

Barangays
Alcantara comprises 9 barangays:

Climate

Demographics

Economy

References

External links
 [ Philippine Standard Geographic Code]

Municipalities of Cebu